The 1987 Virginia Slims of Arizona was a women's  tennis tournament played on outdoor hard courts at the Registry Resort in Scottsdale, Arizona in the United States and was part of the Category 1+ tier of the 1987 WTA Tour. It was the second edition of the tournament and was held from March 9 through March 15, 1987. Fifth-seeded Anne White won the singles title and earned $15,000 first-prize money.

Finals

Singles
 Anne White defeated  Dianne Balestrat 6–1, 6–2
 It was White's only singles title of her career.

Doubles
 Penny Barg /  Beth Herr defeated  Mary-Lou Piatek /  Anne White 2–6, 6–2, 7–6(7–2)

See also
 1987 WCT Scottsdale Open – men's tournament in Scottsdale

References

External links
 ITF tournament edition details
 Tournament draws

Virginia Slims of Arizona
Virginia Slims of Arizona
Virginia Slims of Arizona
Virginia Slims of Arizona